In organic chemistry, a methylidene group is any part of a molecule that consists of two hydrogen atoms bound to a carbon atom, which is connected to the remainder of the molecule by a double bond.

This stands in contrast to methylene, the  group, which is connected to the rest of the molecule by two single bonds. The distinction is often important, because the double bond is chemically different from two single bonds.

The same name (methylidene) was used for the distinct molecule , also known as carbene. Formerly the methylene name was used for all three isomers (methylene, methylidene, and carbene).

Many organic compounds are named and classified as if they were the result of substituting a methylidene group for two adjacent hydrogen atoms of some parent molecule (even if they are not actually obtained that way). Thus, for example,  methylenecyclopropene is named after cyclopropene.

See also 
 Methylene (compound)
 Methylene group
 Methyl group
 Methine

References

Alkanediyl groups
Functional groups